The Methylobacteriaceae are a family of Hyphomicrobiales.

References

Hyphomicrobiales